Same-sex unions are currently not recognized in Namibia. Although the High Court of Namibia agreed in principe on 20 January 2022 that the marriage inequality faced by same-sex couples is unacceptable, it ruled that it was bound by a 2001 Supreme Court case that domestic law does not recognise same-sex relationships. The plaintiffs announced they would consider appealing the decision to the Supreme Court to have its previous ruling overturned.

Background
The Marriage Act (Act 25 of 1961), enacted by the Parliament of South Africa when Namibia was still South West Africa, does not explicitly prohibit the recognition of same-sex marriages; neither does it explicitly define marriage. However, the law has been interpreted not to recognise same-sex unions. When Namibia became independent in 1990, it retained all South African laws unless explicitly repealed or modified by an Act of Parliament. In addition, the Constitution of Namibia does not explicitly permit same-sex marriages and states in Article 14(2):

Article 14(1) states that men and women of full age may enter into marriage irrespective of their race, colour, religion, ethnicity, creed, social or economic status, or nationality. Furthermore, men and women are entitled to the same rights and obligations, whether during the marriage or at its dissociation. Article 14(3) places the family as the "natural and fundamental unit of society", entitled to special protection by the State.

Anal intercourse among men remains illegal in Namibia as per the Criminal Procedure Act (Act 51 of 1977). Although nobody has ever been convicted, this "crime" is occasionally reported to the police, resulting in arrests and fingerprinting, and instilling fear in the gay community.

Political positions
Christian organisations in Namibia are generally opposed to the recognition of same-sex unions. John Walters, then ombudsman of Namibia, expressed his support for same-sex marriage in August 2016. Since Yvonne Dausab became Minister of Justice in 2020, the SWAPO-led government has softened its position, suggesting that the cabinet discuss scrapping the sodomy law. Until then, SWAPO was fiercely against same-sex marriage. The government has lost several court cases on the issue of LGBT rights in Namibia; in October 2021, the government lost in court when High Court Judge Thomas Masuku ruled that the son of a same-sex couple born via surrogacy in South Africa was a Namibian citizen by descent.

Of the other parties represented in the Parliament of Namibia, the Christian Democratic Voice (CDV) and the Namibian Economic Freedom Fighters (NEEF) are staunchly against same-sex marriage. The Popular Democratic Movement (PDM) is ambivalent on the issue.

Court cases

Chairperson of the Immigration Selection Board v Frank and Another
In the late 90s, Elizabeth Khaxas and her German partner Erna Elizabeth Frank sued to have their lesbian relationship recognised. Namibian law grants residency and citizenship to foreign nationals who marry Namibian citizens. However, as the couple's same-sex relationship was not recognised by law, Frank could not obtain permanent residency or citizenship. She applied for a permanent residence permit with the Immigration Selection Board twice, in 1996 and 1997. The Board rejected the application both times. The High Court ruled in favor of the couple in 1998, directing the Board to issue a residence permit to Frank. The Board appealed the decision to the Supreme Court. In Chairperson of the Immigration Selection Board v Frank and Another on 5 March 2001, the Supreme Court held that:

While the court ruled that Frank should be granted a permanent residence permit, which she received a year later, it did not rule in favour of recognising same-sex relationships by law.

Digashu v GRN & Seiler-Lilles v GRN
In December 2017, Johann Potgieter and his South African husband Daniel Digashu filed a lawsuit in the High Court, Digashu v Government of the Republic of Namibia, to have their marriage recognised in Namibia. The couple had married in South Africa in 2015, but Digashu is not recognised by the Namibian Government as Potgieter's spouse, causing several legal and bureaucratic problems as he cannot receive permanent residency or citizenship, as is granted to married opposite-sex partners. In January 2018, officials granted the couple's application to allow Digashu and their son to enter Namibia, as the High Court continued to review their case. Another case, Seiler-Lilles v Government of the Republic of Namibia, was filed in 2018 by Anette Seiler-Liles and her German wife Anita Seiler-Lilles, who have been together since 1998. The couple argues that their 2017 German marriage should be recognized in Namibia.

In June 2019, Judge President Petrus Damaseb directed that a full bench of three judges should be designated to hear all pending cases. In September 2019, the couples agreed to consolidate their lawsuits. Judges Hannelie Prinsloo, Orben Sibeya and Esi Schimming-Chase heard oral arguments in the combined court case on 20 May 2021. The couples asked the court to recognise their marriages performed outside of Namibia. Senior counsel Raymond Heathcote, representing the plaintiffs, argued that the case would not legalise same-sex marriage in Namibia but seeks to recognise marriages performed elsewhere. He argued that the Constitution gives men and women the right to marry without limitation due to their social status, and that discrimination based on sexual orientation is discrimination on the basis of sex and social status, two grounds on which the Constitution forbids all discrimination. A judgment was issued on 20 January 2022. The judges agreed in principle with the plaintiffs, but ruled that they were bound by the 2001 case of Chairperson of the Immigration Selection Board v Frank and Another and as a result could not rule in favour of same-sex marriage. The judges encouraged the couples to appeal to the Supreme Court to have its previous ruling overturned. Judge Prinsloo said, "Only the Supreme Court can correct itself", adding that "it [is] high time the constitution reflect[s] social reality". The couples said they were "disappointed" with the decision but would now consider an appeal to the Supreme Court. Lawyer Carli Schlickerling, representing the plaintiffs, said "The court said to us this morning, 'look, we want to help you, we believe that you should be succeeding on the constitutional issues'. It seems that the court is setting out to the Supreme Court why we should succeed on appeal."

The Supreme Court heard oral arguments on 3 March 2023.

Grobler v Minister of Home Affairs and Immigration
In 2018, lawyer Anita Grobler from Otjiwarongo and her South African spouse Susan Jacobs, together for over 25 years, filed a lawsuit in the High Court to have their 2009 South African marriage recognized in Namibia and to obtain residency rights for Jacobs. The lawsuit named the Minister of Home Affairs and Immigration as the defendant. The Immigration Selection Board decided on 25 July 2019 to approve Jacobs' application for a permanent residence permit. She made the required payment of N$18,000 for the permit, but as of October 2019 it had still not been issued to her. The couple agreed to consider a settlement agreement and the withdrawal of their lawsuit once the residence permit was issued.

Lühl v Minister of Home Affairs and Immigration
In March 2022, Supreme Court Chief Justice Peter Shivute ordered the Ministry of Home Affairs to re-evaluate the application for residency of Mexican national Guillermo Delgado, married to Namibian national Phillip Lühl. Despite the narrow scope of the ruling, activist Ndilokelwa Nthetwa welcomed the decision, "The couple themselves, this impacts them and not necessarily for the community, but it is a win in the way that the Supreme Court has recognized that the ministry has abused public policy (trust) to treat this couple and their family in a very inhumane and hostile manner".

See also
LGBT rights in Namibia
Recognition of same-sex unions in Africa
Same-sex union court cases

Notes

References

LGBT in Namibia
Namibian culture
Namibia